Guy Mortier (born 24 March 1943) is a Flemish journalist and radio and television personality. He is known as former chief editor of magazine HUMO for over thirty years (1969–2003). He was also jury member in the radio programs De taalstrijd and De Perschefs.

He is also known as panel member in the television show Alles Kan Beter which first aired in December 1997.

In 2014, he received the Vlaamse Cultuurprijs voor Algemene Culturele Verdienste, a prize for contributions to the culture of Flanders.

References

External links 
 

1943 births
Living people
Belgian editors
Belgian magazine editors
Belgian radio presenters
Belgian music critics
Belgian journalists
Male journalists
Flemish journalists
Belgian magazine publishers (people)